Banwari Lal may refer to:

Banwari Lal (revolutionary), Indian revolutionary
Banwari Lal (biotechnologist) (born 1960), Indian biotechnologist
Banwari Lal Joshi, Indian civil servant and former Governor of the Indian state of Uttar Pradesh
Banwarilal Purohit (born 1940), Indian politician from Rajasthan
Banwari Lal Agrawal, Indian politician from Chhattisgarh
Banwari Lal Sharma, Indian politician from Madhya Pradesh
Banwari Lal Hansaria, former judge of the Supreme Court of India.
Banwari Lal Chouksey, Indian machinist and inventor
Banwari Lal (Haryana politician), Indian politician from Haryana